The Trinity 2nd Sermon is the second EP by American hip hop group The Lox. The EP was released on November 5, 2014, by D-Block Records.

Track listing

Charts

References

2014 EPs
The Lox albums
Sequel albums